The 2014 Women's Under 18 Australian Championships was a field hockey tournament held in the Victorian city of Melbourne.

Queensland won the gold medal by defeating the New South Wales 5–2 in the final. Victoria Blue won the bronze medal by defeating Australian Capital Territory 3–2 in the third and fourth place playoff.

Competition format
The tournament is divided into two pools, Pool A and Pool B, each consisting of five teams in a round robin format. Throughout the pool stage however, teams from each pool competed in crossover matches with the teams in the other pool, with each team playing one crossover match.

At the conclusion of the pool stage, the top two teams of Pools A and B progressed through to the semi-finals, where the top placed teams of each pool competed against the second placed team of each pool, with the winners progressing to the final.

The bottom three teams then play in crossover matches with teams from the other pool, the results of these matches determine the playoff games, with best results playing for fifth and worst results playing for 9th.

Teams
Unlike other National Australian Championships, teams from New South Wales, Queensland and Victoria are eligible to enter two teams.

  ACT
  NSW State
  NSW Blue
  NT
  QLD
  SA
  TAS
  VIC Blue
  VIC White
  WA

Results

Preliminary round

Pool A

Pool B

Second round

Fifth to tenth place classification

Crossover matches

Ninth and tenth place

Seventh and eighth place

Fifth and sixth place

First to fourth place classification

Semi-finals

Third and fourth place

Final

Awards

Statistics

Final standings

References

External links

2014
2014 in Australian women's field hockey